Gontier may refer to:

Places
Arrondissement of Château-Gontier, arrondissement of France, located in the Mayenne département, in the Pays de la Loire région
Château-Gontier, commune in the Mayenne department in north-western France

People
Adam Gontier (born 1978), Canadian musician and songwriter
Émile Gontier (1878–1947), French track and field athlete who competed at the 1900 Summer Olympics in Paris, France
Gontier de Soignies, medieval trouvère and composer who was active from c. 1180 to 1220
Jean Gontier (born 1942), Swiss fencer
Nicole Gontier (born 1991), Italian biathlete

See also
Gonthier